Spade is an unincorporated community and census-designated place (CDP) in Lamb County, Texas, United States. The population was 73 at the 2010 census.

History

Spade was named for its location on the former Spade Ranch. According to the Handbook of Texas, J. Frank Norfleet, ranch foreman, married and brought his wife to headquarters near the present townsite in 1894. The townsite was founded in 1924 when farmers began settling on former ranchland. A store and a cotton gin were built in 1931, which became the nucleus of the community. A post office was secured in 1935 and by 1940 Spade had two churches, six businesses, and 200 people. Spade has its own water system that draws on the underlying Ogallala Aquifer.

To the north of Spade is the Triple Arrow Ranch, a  spread with historic relics owned by Lamb County Commissioner's Court Judge William A. Thompson, Jr., and his wife, LeNora Jo Thompson.

Geography
Spade is located at  (33.9262001 -102.1535093).

Demographics
As of the census of 2000, there were 100 people, 38 households, and 31 families residing in the CDP. The population density was 51.0 people per square mile (19.7/km2). There were 49 housing units at an average density of 25.0 per square mile (9.7/km2). The racial makeup of the CDP was 72.00% White, 10.00% African American, 18.00% from other races. Hispanic or Latino of any race were 38.00% of the population.

There were 38 households, out of which 39.5% had children under the age of 18 living with them, 55.3% were married couples living together, 18.4% had a female householder with no husband present, and 15.8% were non-families. 15.8% of all households were made up of individuals, and 7.9% had someone living alone who was 65 years of age or older. The average household size was 2.63 and the average family size was 2.84.

In the CDP, the population was spread out, with 28.0% under the age of 18, 15.0% from 18 to 24, 32.0% from 25 to 44, 15.0% from 45 to 64, and 10.0% who were 65 years of age or older. The median age was 29 years. For every 100 females, there were 81.8 males. For every 100 females age 18 and over, there were 94.6 males.

The median income for a household in the CDP was $36,250, and the median income for a family was $36,875. Males had a median income of $23,750 versus $26,250 for females. The per capita income for the CDP was $11,917. There were 21.2% of families and 14.9% of the population living below the poverty line, including 12.8% of under eighteens and none of those over 64.

Education
On July 1, 2006, Spade Independent School District, which formerly served Spade, merged with Olton ISD to form Olton ISD. The consolidation of the school was featured in a segment of Texas Country Reporter. The students invited Sherman Jones, a wounded Korean War veteran, to take part in the final graduation ceremony, as he had never graduated from the school.

See also
Spade Ranch (Texas)
Llano Estacado
Blackwater Draw
Yellow House Draw

References

External links
Handbook of Texas: Spade, TX (Lamb County)

Census-designated places in Lamb County, Texas
Census-designated places in Texas
Populated places established in 1924
1924 establishments in Texas